Lukáš Beer (born 23 August 1989) is a Slovak athlete specialising in the high jump. He finished sixth at the 2015 Summer Universiade.

His personal bests in the event are 2.26 metres outdoors (Banská Bystrica 2014) and 2.28 metres indoors (Banská Bystrica 2017).

International competitions

References

1989 births
Living people
Slovak male high jumpers
Athletes (track and field) at the 2015 European Games
Sportspeople from Košice
European Games competitors for Slovakia
Athletes (track and field) at the 2019 European Games